Tåsen is a neighborhood in the west side of Oslo, Norway, approx. four  north of the city centre. The name originates from the Norse name Tásvin. The Tåsen station serves the area.

References

Map of area

Neighbourhoods of Oslo